Anagnina is a station of Line A of the Rome Metro. It is located at the junction between Via Tuscolana and Via Anagnina, close to the depot of Osteria del Curato.

History 
The Anagnina station was built as the south-eastern terminus of the first section of metro Line A, which came into service on 16 February 1980.

Description 

Anagnina is an underground terminal station with two tracks served by two platforms not directly connected to each other. On the floor above that of the platforms there are the ticket offices and a police cage watching the entrance to the station area.

Inside the station, the electric locomotive nr. 82 - which belonged to the former railway company of Rome (STEFER) and served on the Tranvie dei Castelli Romani network - is now preserved as a monument.
The station hall also contains some mosaics created for the Artemetro Roma Prize: the authors are the Italian Luigi Veronesi and Lucio del Pezzo, the Swiss Gottfried Honegger and the Russian Mikhail Koulakov. The mosaics are said to be a success in that they brighten up otherwise sombre spaces.

Located nearby 
 Osteria del Curato
 Grande Raccordo Anulare
 Cinecittà
 La Romanina
 University of Rome Tor Vergata
 Ciampino
 Cinecittà Est

Services 
The station is equipped with a video surveillance system and two exchange parking lots.
It is one of the main transport interchanges with urban and suburban bus lines, managed by ATAC and Cotral respectively; there is also a shuttle that offers a direct connection with the Rome-Ciampino Airport.

 Four parking lots, with a total of almost 2000 places.
 Ticket office
  Ticket machine
  Bar
  Shops
 Shuttle to Rome Ciampino Airport
 Terminus for regional buses (COTRAL)
 Urban buses: 20 Express - 046 - 047 - 500 - 502 - 504 - 505 - 506 - 507 - 509 - 515 - 551 - 559 - N1 - N1P

References

Bibliography

External links 
 Station map

Rome Metro Line A stations
Railway stations opened in 1980
1980 establishments in Italy
Railway stations in Italy opened in the 20th century